Thomas Valley is a valley at the east side of McClelland Ridge in the east part of Olympus Range, Victoria Land. Named by Advisory Committee on Antarctic Names (US-ACAN) (1997) after Jean-Claude Thomas, an Associate Professor of Geography-Cartography, Catholic University of America from 1967 to 1976, George Mason University, 1976–85; United States Geological Survey (USGS) Cartographer from 1985, specializing in satellite image mapping at various scales, including the 1:25,000-scale color maps of McMurdo Dry Valleys, 1997.

See also
Artemis Ridge

References

External links

Valleys of Victoria Land
McMurdo Dry Valleys